Lomatiinae is a subfamily of bee flies in the family Bombyliidae. There are about 16 genera and at least 290 described species in Lomatiinae.

Genera
These 16 genera belong to the subfamily Lomatiinae:

 Aleucosia Edwards, 1934 c g
 Anisotamia Macquart, 1840 c g
 Brachydemia Hull, 1973 c g
 Bryodemina Hull, 1973 i c g
 Canariellum Strand, 1928 c g
 Comptosia Macquart, 1840 c g
 Doddosia Edwards, 1934 c g
 Edmundiella Becker, 1915 c g
 Lomatia Meigen, 1822 c g
 Macrocondyla Rondani, 1863 c g
 Notolomatia Greathead, 1998 c g
 Ogcodocera Macquart, 1840 i c g b
 Oncodosia Edwards, 1934 c g
 Peringueyimyia Bigot, 1886 c g
 Ylasoia Speiser, 1920 c g
 † Alomatia Cockerell, 1914 c g

Data sources: i=ITIS, c=Catalogue of Life, g=GBIF, b=Bugguide.net

References

Further reading

External links
 

Bombyliidae
Asilomorpha subfamilies